Ronald Reagan has been variously depicted in popular culture since he was elected president in 1980. Reagan also appeared numerous times in popular fiction, particularly in his role as U.S. president in the 1980s.

Film and television 
 Rap Master Ronnie: A Report Card, a satirical depiction of Reagan's presidency aired as a Cinemax Comedy Experiment
 Spitting Image, a satirical British puppet show featuring Reagan
 The Day Reagan Was Shot, a 2001 film about the attempted assassination of Ronald Reagan
 The Reagans, a 2003 television film about Ronald Reagan and his family
 Reagan, a 2011 documentary film about the presidency of Ronald Reagan
 The Butler, a 2013 film about an African-American butler who bore witness to the presidency of Ronald Reagan
 Killing Reagan (film), a 2016 television film about the attempted assassination of Ronald Reagan
 Reagan, a 2023 film starring Dennis Quaid

Reagan appeared as one of the fictional supporting characters in the Inhumanoids episode "The Surma Plan" as president of the United States. Upon learning that the Soviet leadership were planning an Earth-threatening attack on the lair of the Inhumanoid leader Metlar, Reagan first suggested that they contact the Soviets. After being advised that the Soviets wouldn't listen he instead contacted the Earth Corps to stop the Soviet mission that could end up destroying the planet itself. He later expressed gratitude to the Earth Corps for stopping the Soviet plan. Reagan was portrayed by voice actor Neil Ross.

In the second season of the television series Fargo, Reagan (Bruce Campbell) makes a stop during his second presidential campaign in 1979 in the titular town; Campbell previously appeared in the 1995 film Fargo on a television screen and credited as "Soap Opera TV Star"; the season retroactively establishes this character as Reagan from his former career as an actor.

Also, in the first film of Back to the Future, Reagan is referenced heavily in the first part of the movie, in which 1955 Doc Brown mocks Marty McFly after he answered Reagan was the president, as at 1955, Reagan was still an actor, referenced earlier in the film when his name appeared on a theater on the background

Literature

Comics 
Ronald Reagan met Captain America in Marvel Comics, would become the paranormal hero "Teflon" in New Universe and was even depicted as the star of the Solsons' Comics series Reagans Raiders, in 1987.

Marvel Transformers UK Annual 1985 contained a story called "Plague of the Insecticons". Optimus Prime lead Prowl and Warpath to a meeting with President Ronald Reagan in Washington D.C. to open a dialog between the Autobots and the US government. The evil Insecticons attack the US military in the name of the Autobots hoping to derail the peace talks. Although the Autobots managed to chase off the Insecticons Optimus Prime gave up on explaining the misunderstanding to Reagan, thinking he would never be believed. Reagan had been ready to hear what Optimus had to say and was disappointed they gave up so easily. In 1986, Ronald Reagan made an appearance in volume 1, issue 8, of the DC Comics series Booster Gold.

Reagan would also make an appearance in Strontium Dog, a long running strip in the British comic 2000 AD. In the storyline 'Bitch' (Progs 505–529, 1987), he is kidnapped and held hostage by time travelling alien freedom fighters. The Reagan of this story is depicted as somewhat bumbling and not at all aware of what is happening; despite all evidence to the contrary, he maintains the opinion throughout that he has been kidnapped by the 'Commies'.

In the 1986 miniseries The Dark Knight Returns, Superman is an operative for the United States government, covertly fighting Soviet forces in Latin America and serving as the president's right-hand man. Though unnamed, this president bears an identical resemblance to Reagan, who was in office when the comic was published. He also possesses Reagan's folksy way of speaking.

Reagan was also a key character in the satirical comic strip Benchley by Mort Drucker and Jerry Dumas. The plot revolved around the fictive character Benchley who served as Reagan's assistant.

Web original

On the collaborative fiction writing website SCP Foundation, Ronald Reagan is depicted in SCP-1981, an anomalous VHS tape that depicts the president giving corrupted versions of his Evil Empire speech while accompanied by a black hooded figure, all while being gradually mutilated by an unseen force until he is unable to continue speaking. The tape changes in content every time it is viewed. The real-life Reagan of the SCP universe was said to have developed an unhealthy obsession and chronic nightmares with SCP-1981 after being shown the tape, and developed Alzheimer's Disease after Secret Service agents' unqualified attempt at inducing a drug-induced amnesia using amnestics stolen from the SCP Foundation.

Music 

Reagan is the subject of many songs.

Toys
In 2020, Amazo Toys ran a successful Kickstarter campaign for the United States Space Force Action Figures. The basic 4 inch tall action figure for the Space Force Red team came with six head options, one of which was the Ghost of Ronald Reagan. In the series fiction the Ghost of Ronald Reagan is part of the Space Force Red team, led by Donald Trump, which is teamed up with the Space Force Blue team to right the Russian Space Agency.

A second Kickstarter campaign by Amazo Toys was American Presidents Action Figure Collection which included a Ronald Reagan figure with two alternate heads.

Video games
 Reagan was featured as easter egg in 2002 video game Grand Theft Auto: Vice City where he was seen in a poster shooting then Soviet leader Mikhail Gorbachev. He is also mentioned on the radio in the game and is also mentioned in the 2006 prequel game Grand Theft Auto: Vice City Stories.
 On August 26, 2020, in the worldwide reveal of Call of Duty: Black Ops Cold War, Reagan is the president of the United States in the campaign. He is voiced by Jeff Bergman.
 In the video game Wasteland 3, a digitized version of Ronald Reagan is displayed on a computer screen similar to how Max Headroom was often depicted.

Postage stamps
After Reagan's death, the United States Postal Service issued a President Ronald Reagan commemorative postage stamp in 2005.

See also
 "What would Reagan do?" is a phrase that has become popular, primarily among conservatives and Republicans in the United States.

References

See also
 Cultural depictions of Margaret Thatcher